Union is the second album by The Boxer Rebellion,  released worldwide on January 11, 2009, only through iTunes.

The track "Silent Movie" stops at around 4:30 leaving 39 seconds of silence at the end of the track.

The track "Semi-Automatic" featured on a Waterloo episode in 2009.

A physical release has been available since September 14 (UK) and September 11 (ROI). It is available in physical format, exclusively at HMV stores in Canada and has been so since 7 July 2009.

"Evacuate" and "Spitting Fire" were featured on the soundtrack of Going the Distance

Track listing

Charts

Awards

References

2009 albums
The Boxer Rebellion (band) albums